Michelle Jenny Betos (born February 20, 1988) is an American professional soccer player who plays as a goalkeeper for NJ/NY Gotham FC of the National Women's Soccer League (NWSL).

Betos previously played for Vålerenga, Apollon Limassol, Portland Thorns FC, New York Fury, OL Reign, and Racing Louisville FC. In 2015, while playing for Portland, Betos won the NWSL Goalkeeper of the Year award.

Early life
Born in Queens, New York to parents Luke and Susan Betos, Michelle began playing soccer at age five.  She attended St. Francis Preparatory School in the New York City borough of Queens. She was a two-year captain on the soccer team and was named 2005 Most Valuable Player. She played for the Albertson Fury '87 from 2004 to 2006 and was a member of the Region I Olympic Development Program (ODP) team in 2006. In 2005, she was named an ENYSSA State Team player and participated in the Super Y-League Olympic Development Program (ODP) National Camp.

University of Georgia
Betos attended the University of Georgia. She finished her college career with a total of 316 saves, ranking third all-time at Georgia and second in shutout count (26) and win totals (48). During her senior year, she started all 22 games, logging 1,929 minutes and earned eight shutouts and a goals-against average (GAA) of 1.12 per game. Her junior year, she appeared in all 23 games making 22 starts. She recorded seven shutouts and a 1.19 GAA, finishing the season with 117 saves. Betos was named SEC All-Tournament Team and SEC Defensive Player of the Week on October 21, 2008. In 2007, she started all 24 games, finishing with 18 wins, eight shutouts and a 0.79 GAA. She recorded a save percentage of .816, making 84 saves and allowing 19 goals. She was named the team's Defensive Most Valuable Player. During her freshman year, Betos appeared in 12 games in goal, making eight starts. She led Georgia in GAA (1.18), save percentage (.732), fewest goals allowed (11), wins (5), shutouts (3) and saves (30). She was named to the SEC All-Freshman Team the same year.

Club career

Atlanta Silverbacks
Betos played for the Atlanta Silverbacks of the W-League during the 2009 season. She was named W-League Goalkeeper of the Year after leading the Atlanta Silverbacks to the regular season Southeast Division title. She finished the season with a 9–1–1 record and the team finished 10–1–1. She ranked second in the league for her 0.188 goals-against average, nine wins and nine shutouts.

New York Fury
Betos signed with the New York Fury in the Women's Premier Soccer League Elite for the 2012 season.

Apollon Limassol
Betos signed with Apollon Limassol in the UEFA Women's Champions League for the 2012–2013 season. She recorded five appearances for the team for a total of 450 minutes.

Seattle Reign FC
Betos was selected by the Seattle Reign FC during the 2013 NWSL Supplemental Draft as their fifth pick (34th pick overall). She was the starting goalkeeper for seven of the club's matches during the beginning of the 2013 season before Hope Solo returned from wrist surgery recovery. Betos made 34 saves and registered a 2.0 goals against average.

Portland Thorns FC
In the 2013–14 offseason, Seattle traded Betos and Kristie Mewis to the Boston Breakers for Sydney Leroux. Boston soon traded Betos to Portland for the thirty-fourth pick in the 2014 NWSL College Draft. Initially serving as a backup to Nadine Angerer, Betos made 14 starts during the 2015 season. On June 19, 2015, Betos scored the equalizing goal for 10-man Portland in the 95th minute against FC Kansas City. This was the first ever goal scored by a goalkeeper in the NWSL. Her goal was featured on ESPN SportsCenter as the #2 play during the show's Top 10 feature. She was subsequently named NWSL Player of the Week. Following the season, she was named NWSL Goalkeeper of the Year. Betos was part of the 2016 Thorns team that won the NWSL Shield.

Sydney FC
In September 2015, Betos joined Sydney FC on loan for the 2015–16 season.

Vålerenga
Betos signed with Norwegian Toppserien side Vålerenga Fotball Damer in 2017.

Return to Seattle Reign FC
On January 30, 2018, Seattle Reign FC announced that Betos would be returning to the club for the 2018 National Women's Soccer League season.

Racing Louisville FC
On November 12, 2020, Betos was selected by Racing Louisville FC in the 2020 NWSL Expansion Draft.

NJ/NY Gotham FC
Betos returned to the New York metro area by signing with NJ/NY Gotham FC on January 11, 2022.

References

External links
 
 Georgia player profile
 New York Fury player profile
 

Living people
1988 births
Sportspeople from Queens, New York
Soccer players from New York City
American women's soccer players
National Women's Soccer League players
OL Reign players
New York Fury players
Portland Thorns FC players
Fortuna Hjørring players
Sydney FC (A-League Women) players
Racing Louisville FC players
Georgia Bulldogs women's soccer players
Expatriate women's footballers in Cyprus
Expatriate women's footballers in Denmark
Expatriate women's footballers in Argentina
Apollon Ladies F.C. players
Women's association football goalkeepers
Atlanta Silverbacks Women players
Vålerenga Fotball Damer players
Boston Aztec (WPSL) players
Women's Premier Soccer League players
Club Atlético River Plate (women) players
OL Reign draft picks
American expatriate sportspeople in Cyprus
American expatriate sportspeople in Denmark
American expatriate sportspeople in Argentina
NJ/NY Gotham FC players